The 2015–16 Idaho State Bengals men's basketball team represented Idaho State University during the 2015–16 NCAA Division I men's basketball season. The Bengals, led by fourth year head coach Bill Evans, played their home games at Holt Arena and Reed Gym and were members of the Big Sky Conference. They finished the season 16–15, 11–7 in Big Sky play to finish in fourth place. They lost in the quarterfinals of the Big Sky tournament to North Dakota.

Roster

Schedule

|-
!colspan=9 style="background:#000000; color:#FF8300;"| Exhibition

|-
!colspan=9 style="background:#000000; color:#FF8300;"| Regular season

|-
!colspan=9 style="background:#000000; color:#FF8300;"| Big Sky tournament

References

Idaho State Bengals men's basketball seasons
Idaho State
IIdaho
IIdaho